Parizh (for "Paris") is a village (selo) in Nagaybaksky District of Chelyabinsk Oblast, Russia, located on the south border of the district.  Population: 2,390 (1997 est.).

It was established as a Nağaybäk Cossack settlement in 1842 and soon after was given its name to honor the Battle of Paris.  Several other villages named for Russian victories in Napoleonic Wars are located nearby: Fershampenuaz (the administrative center of the district), Leyptsig, Berlin, and others.

In 2005, an Eiffel Tower 1:5 replica was constructed in Parizh to serve as a cellular network station.

Rural localities in Chelyabinsk Oblast